"Cry" is a single album recorded by South Korean girl group Stellar. It was released as their seventh single album and ninth single overall. The song was released on July 18, 2016 by The Entertainment Pascal and distributed by Universal Music. In order to promote the song, Stellar appeared in several South Korean music programs, including Music Bank and Inkigayo. A music video for the song was also released on July 18.

The EP was a commercial success peaking at number 16 on the Gaon Album Chart.

Background and release 
On May 20, 2016, it was reported that Stellar was making a comeback in early July with a new song, after six months since the last single, "Sting". On July 8, it was reported that a minor car accident occurred during the filming for the music video for the upcoming title track, resulting in a visit to the hospital with no major injuries.

On July 10, The Entertainment Pascal officially announced that the group will be releasing a song called "Crying" on July 18, revealing teaser images of each member. On July 13 a music video teaser was released and the track list was also released, revealing that the song will be produced by Brave Brothers. On July 15 a second music video teaser was released.

On July 18 the song was released online in several music portals in South Korea, such as MelOn, along with the music video.

Promotion 
The music video for "Crying" was released on July 18, 2016 in conjunction with the single. They made their official comeback stage on SBS MTV's The Show performing their title track "Crying". They also perform on Show Champion on July 19, M Countdown on July 20, Music Bank on July 21, Music Core on July 22 and on Inkigayo on July 23.

Chart performance 
"Cry" entered and peaked at number 16 on the Gaon Album Chart on the chart issue dated July 17–23, 2016. In its second week, the song charted at number 34. In its third consecutive week, the single album charted at number 61.

Track listing

Charts

Weekly charts

Single charts
'Crying'

Release history

References 

2016 singles
2016 songs
Stellar (South Korean band) songs